The 1985 WCT Houston Shootout was a men's tennis tournament played on outdoor hard courts. It was a World Championship Tennis event which was part of the 1985 Nabisco Grand Prix, as the two organisations had reunited. It was played in Houston, United States from February 25 through March 3, 1985. John McEnroe won the singles title and $60,000 prize money.

Prize money

per team

Finals

Singles

 John McEnroe defeated  Kevin Curren, 7–5, 6–1, 7–6(7–4)
 It was McEnroe's 2nd singles title of the year and the 61st of his career.

Doubles
 Peter Fleming /  John McEnroe defeated  Hank Pfister /  Ben Testerman, 6–3, 6–2

References

External links
 ITF tournament edition details

1985 Grand Prix (tennis)
World Championship Tennis
1985 in Texas